Cream filling may refer to:

 Custard
 Whipped cream